Magical Thinking is a 2004 memoir by American writer Augusten Burroughs.  The book contains stories from the adult life of the author.

References

2004 non-fiction books
American memoirs
LGBT literature in the United States